Lawrence Sher,  (born February 4, 1970) is an American cinematographer and film director, best known for comedy films such as Garden State, The Dictator, and The Hangover series, frequently collaborating with directors Todd Phillips and Zach Braff. He made his directorial debut with Father Figures, which began a wide theatrical release on December 22, 2017, by Warner Bros. Pictures. He was nominated for an Academy Award and BAFTA Award for Best Cinematography for the 2019 film Joker, directed by Phillips.

Life and career
Sher was born to a Jewish family and raised in Teaneck, New Jersey, where he attended and graduated in 1988 from Teaneck High School. His father, Paul, had been a doctor at New York University Medical Center, while his mother, Joan, was a teacher and taught at the Queens-based Lexington School for the Deaf. It was on a high school-sponsored trip to Paris that Sher first developed a love for photography, after his father convinced him to take a 35mm camera along with him on the trip. Sher has maintained his connections to Teaneck, staying in the basement of his aunt's home there during the filming of Garden State, where he was able to use love of his home state to make location shots there make it appear as what The Record described as a "verdant wonderland". He expressed great pride for his hometown of Teaneck and its diversity, recalling how he "spent a lot of time with an eclectic group of people. There's nothing homogenized about Teaneck even though you're in the middle of suburban New Jersey."

He attended Wesleyan University, where he had initially planned to pursue a career in medicine followed by his identical twin brother Andy, who later became a urologist. After taking a course on film history, Sher developed an immediate interest in cinema, recalling that "All I wanted to do was spend every waking moment learning about movies and cinematography." He decided on majoring in economics and graduated from Wesleyan in 1992.

After graduating from college, he moved to Los Angeles and immediately pursued a career in motion pictures. He started as a gaffer on a video shoot and an assistant on commercials before working his way up to cinematographer. Sher's first major release was the 2001 film Kissing Jessica Stein. He achieved critical success with the 2004 movie Garden State. Duane Byrge of The Hollywood Reporter, in his review for the 2004 Sundance Film Festival, credited Sher's compositions with "pack[ing] insight into the character's psychological states". Sher also has worked on 2007's Dan in Real Life starring Steve Carell and Juliette Binoche and the 2009 release I Love You, Man with Paul Rudd. While Sher aspires to direct, he is in no rush given that "I don't think I’ve fulfilled all of my goals as a cinematographer yet".

As cinematographer of the 2009 film The Hangover, Sher described how a scene early in the movie shows the main characters on the roof of their hotel overlooking a stereotypical shot of the Las Vegas Strip; Sher indicated that he had tried to evoke the behind-the-scenes Vegas—after the characters wake up the following morning—by shooting a scene behind the hotels where the real action takes place. Actor Bradley Cooper credited Sher's visual style with enhancing the film's comedy, noting how Sher has "a great eye, a lot of energy and he just knows what's funny" and that "Some guys just can’t shoot comedies, but Larry knows exactly what he's doing."

With the success of Zach Braff's Kickstarter, Sher worked on Braff's 2014 feature, Wish I Was Here.

In January 2020, Sher was nominated for the Academy Award for Best Cinematography for his work on the movie Joker, but lost to Roger Deakins for 1917.

Personal life
, Sher lives in Los Angeles, California, together with his partner Hema Patel and his 13-year-old son, Max, and daughter Matilda. He was previously married to Jessica Aronoff from 1998 to 2017.

Filmography

Cinematographer

Additional photography credits

Director

References

External links

1970 births
American cinematographers
Living people
Teaneck High School alumni
Wesleyan University alumni
20th-century American Jews
Film directors from Los Angeles
Film directors from New Jersey
21st-century American Jews